Ugo Benassi (24 September 1928 – 17 September 2011) was an Italian politician.

He was a member of the Italian Communist Party. He served as Mayor of Reggio Emilia from 1976 to 1987.

He was elected to the Senate of the Republic in 1987.

Biography
Ugo Benassi was born in Carpineti, Italy in 1928 and died in Reggio Emilia in 2011 at the age of 82.

See also
 List of mayors of Reggio Emilia

References 

1928 births
2011 deaths
Italian Communist Party politicians
21st-century Italian politicians
20th-century Italian politicians
Mayors of Reggio Emilia